Door Lock is a 2018 South Korean thriller drama film directed by Lee Kwon. The film stars Gong Hyo-jin, Kim Ye-won and Kim Sung-oh. It was released on December 5, 2018. The movie is based on the 2011 Spanish movie Sleep Tight. While the Spanish movie tells the story from perpetrator's perspective, the Korean movie tells the same from the point of view of the victim. When she thought that she could start a new life she receives an unknown letter from someone.

Premise
Kyung-min lives alone in a one-room apartment. One day, she found a trace of a stranger breaking into her room and soon a mysterious murder case begins to unravel.

Promotional synopsis
Kyung-Min is an average female living by herself in a studio apartment. When she gets to her place after work, she finds her highly secured door lock cover left open. Slightly scared of this, she changes her password. However, just before she goes to sleep, she hears someone trying to unlock her door. Startled by this, Kyung-Min calls the police. Yet, the cops only show annoyance and no sympathy towards the frightened Kyung-Min. A few days later, she finds more hints of someone trying to enter her home, and a murder incident occurs. Realizing she's not safe and that the police are not to be trusted, she starts investigating on her own. A door lock case left open, unknown fingerprints on the keypads, and a cigarette bud found in front of her door; someone's here!

Cast
Gong Hyo-jin as Cho Kyung-min
Kim Ye-won as Oh Hyo-joo
Kim Sung-oh as Detective Lee
Jo Bok-rae
Lee Ga-sub as Han Dong-hoon
Lee Chun-hee
 Lee Hong-nae as a police officer
 Han Ji-eun as Kang Seung-hye

Production
Principal photography began on January 7, 2018, and wrapped on March 14, 2018.

References

External links
 Door Lock on Naver 
 Door Lock on Daum 
 Door Lock on Hancinema

2018 films
2010s Korean-language films
2018 thriller drama films
South Korean thriller drama films
Films directed by Lee Kwon
2018 drama films
South Korean remakes of Spanish films
2010s South Korean films